The 1998 Florida Commissioner of Agriculture election took place on November 3, 1998, to elect the Florida Commissioner of Agriculture. The incumbent,  Robert B. Crawford, easily defeated Republican Rich Faircloth to win re-election; he served under three governors, Lawton Chiles, Buddy MacKay, and Jeb Bush.

Candidates

Democratic 

  Robert B. Crawford

Republican 

 Rich Faircloth

General Election

References 

Florida Commissioner of Agriculture elections
Commissioner of Agriculture
Florida Commissioner of Agriculture